The Iranian Gendarmerie, also called the Government Gendarmerie, was the first rural police force, and subsequent modern highway patrol, in Iran. A paramilitary force, it also played a significant part in politics from its establishment in 1910 during the Qajar dynasty until the advent of the Pahlavi dynasty in 1921. It continued to serve until the end of the Pahlavi era and was modernized into the Imperial Iranian Gendarmerie. Originally established as a constitutional army, the force employed Swedish officers in command of Iranian personnel to perform both traditional police duties and conduct military campaigns against tribal forces. In 1991 the Iranian Gendarmerie was merged with other police forces to form the Law Enforcement Force of Islamic Republic of Iran.

History

Throughout the nineteenth century military modernization was a constant preoccupation of Iranian reformers and the history of the Qajar period is peppered with attempts to create a standing army on the European model. In an attempt to develop sufficient military strength to defend itself against its external enemies, the Persians chose Sweden to be given the task to secure their trade routes and unify the country. The Persians choose the Swedish police force as a neutral choice between Britain and Russia. Due to European nations running much of Iranian services, many Iranians believed that their rulers were beholden to foreign interests.

Due to a lack of reform to Iranian Government services of Qajar Iran in the late 19th century, Iranian military and police had insufficient modernization. The American Treasurer-General, William Morgan Shuster proposed the creation of a Treasury Gendarmerie. The proposal was passed by the Majlis on 6 July 1911, along with the launching of the Government Gendarmerie. On 15 August 1911, the Swedish Major Harald Hjalmarson was given the rank of General and put in command of the Persian Gendarmerie.  Many other officers, often recruited from the Swedish nobility, would come to follow in Hjalmarson's footsteps. 

During the Persian Campaign of the First World War the officers of the Swedish Gendarmerie, who like most of the Iranian intelligentsia and constitutionalists were sympathetic towards Germany, helped the Central Powers. At one point in autumn 1915 they seized control of Shiraz with the connivance of the German-trained provincial governor Mehdi-Qoli Mokhber'ol Saltaneh Hedayat. After the 1921 coup d'état the War Minister Reza Khan merged the two viable military forces which existed in Iran at that point i.e. the Cossack division and the Gendarmerie; to create the modern Iranian national army. A rural police, amnieh, was created and the nazmieh or the police force was also revamped and placed under Iranian officers.

The disbanding of the Swedish Gendarmerie would greatly weaken the Qajar monarchy and with the Persian Cossack Brigade being the only remaining army unit, it greatly facilitated Reza Shah’s coup in 1921. Hjalmarson would return to Sweden and take command of the volunteer Swedish Brigade serving on the White side in the Finnish Civil War.  Another officer, Eric Carlberg, later become Sweden’s ambassador to Iran, and a confidant of Mohammed Mosaddeq.

Post Revolution
Following the overthrow of the Shah in 1979 the Imperial Iranian Gendarmerie remained in existence, although with charges of title, insignia and senior officers.  In 1992 it was merged with the Shahrbani (Persian: , Šahrbānī) and the Islamic Revolutionary Committees (Persian: , Komīte) into a single national law enforcement force.

Organisation
The Gendarmerie's purpose was to guard the frontiers and the interior. It consisted of a number of battalions, each of 4 to 6 companies. For discipline and administrative purposes, the corps was under the supervision of the general officer commanding the division in whose area it was stationed.  For police administration work, it came under local civil authorities. The force was armed with old pattern rifles of various makes plus some Soviet, French and British carbines, but not many modern. It consisted of a total of 7 Independent Mixed Regiments and 15 Mixed Battalions, forming a Corps.

Commanders

Notable officers
An officer of the Gendarmerie was the last person who in 1915 was awarded the Swedish medal for bravery upon the field of battle "För tapperhet i fält".
Eric Carlberg
Martin Ekström
Carl Petersén
Colonel Mohammad Taqi Pesian
Hasan Arfa
Abolqasem Lahouti
Mahmud Khan Puladeen

Stations
Major
Tehran

Minor
Shiraz
Kerman
Qazvin
Isfahan
Boroujerd

See also
 Nazmiyeh
 Persian Cossack Brigade
 Austro-Hungarian military mission in Persia

References

Sources and further reading
English

The Times; "Policing Persia–The Work of the Swedish Gendarmerie", 27 December 1913
The Army and the Creation of the Pahlavi State in Iran 1910-1926, by Stephanie Cronin

Swedish
Carlberg, Eric; "På uppdrag i Persien. Glimtar från en trettioårig vistelse under solens och lejonets tecken" Stockholm; Natur & Kultur, 1962.

 
Military history of Iran
Military units and formations of Iran
Military history of Qajar Iran
Military history of Sweden
Iran–Sweden relations
Defunct gendarmeries
1910 establishments in Iran